The twelfth season of Saturday Night Live, an American sketch comedy series, originally aired in the United States on NBC between October 11, 1986 and May 23, 1987.

History
The season opened with Madonna, host of the previous season opener, reading a "statement" from NBC about season 11's mediocre writing and bad cast choices. According to the "statement", the entire 1985–86 season was "...all a dream. A horrible, horrible dream."

The season included "Mastermind", a skit written by Jim Downey and Al Franken, in which Phil Hartman portrayed two sides of Ronald Reagan; 25 years later Todd Purdum called the skit "surely among the show's Top 10 of all time".

Also during this season, singer David Johansen made several guest appearances as his famous persona, Buster Poindexter, performing with the SNL house band.

A new logo was introduced for this season: it consisted of a yellow square and a small black rectangle; the yellow square had "SATURDAY" and "LIVE" in it; between them was a black rectangle with the word "NIGHT" in it. It was used only until the following season.

Cast
Most of season 11's cast members were fired, except for A. Whitney Brown, Nora Dunn, Jon Lovitz and Dennis Miller. Al Franken was rehired as a writer. Franken also appeared in several episodes, but was not credited as a cast member this season. The new cast members included Dana Carvey, Phil Hartman, Jan Hooks, Victoria Jackson and Kevin Nealon. Phil Hartman helped write sketches in season 11's Thanksgiving episode hosted by Pee-wee Herman, and appeared in a sketch as a Pilgrim. Jan Hooks had auditioned for the show twice, firstly for season 10, but lost to Pamela Stephenson and the second time for season 11, but lost to Joan Cusack.

Cast roster

Repertory players
Dana Carvey
Nora Dunn
Phil Hartman
Jan Hooks
Victoria Jackson
Jon Lovitz
Dennis Miller

Featured players
A. Whitney Brown
Kevin Nealon

bold denotes Weekend Update anchor

Writers

This season's writers were Andy Breckman, A. Whitney Brown, E. Jean Carroll, Tom Davis, Jim Downey, Al Franken, Jack Handey, Phil Hartman, George Meyer, Lorne Michaels, Kevin Nealon, Herb Sargent, Marc Shaiman, Rosie Shuster, Robert Smigel, Bonnie Turner, Terry Turner, Jon Vitti and Christine Zander. Downey also served as head writer.

Episodes

References

12
1986 American television seasons
1987 American television seasons
Saturday Night Live in the 1980s